Päide is a village in Rakvere Parish, Lääne-Viru County, in northeastern Estonia.

References

 

Villages in Lääne-Viru County